Cnemaspis monticola, also known as the Waynaad day gecko, is a species of gecko endemic to southern India.

References

Cnemaspis
Reptiles of India
Reptiles described in 2007